Shaheer McBride (born February 8, 1985) is a former American football wide receiver. He was signed by the Philadelphia Eagles as an undrafted free agent in 2008. He played college football at Delaware State.

McBride has also played for the Hartford Colonials.

College career
McBride played four seasons at Delaware State University, where he finished 2nd in all-time catches, and 3rd in all-time yards.

Professional career
After going undrafted in the 2008 NFL Draft, McBride was signed by the Philadelphia Eagles as an undrafted free agent. He spent the entire 2008 season on the team's practice squad.

McBride was waived by the Eagles on August 25, 2009.

References

External links

Delaware State Hornets bio

1985 births
Living people
Sportspeople from Chester, Pennsylvania
Players of American football from Pennsylvania
American football wide receivers
Delaware State Hornets football players
Philadelphia Eagles players
Hartford Colonials players